Linda Bartelsmeyer is a former American Republican politician from Monett, Missouri, who served in the Missouri House of Representatives.

Born in Carthage, Missouri, she attended Jasper High School and Missouri Southern State College.  On November 22, 1980, she married Bob Bartelsmeyer who served as a county clerk for Lawrence County, Missouri, for nearly 25 years.

References

Living people
20th-century American politicians
21st-century American politicians
20th-century American women politicians
21st-century American women politicians
Republican Party members of the Missouri House of Representatives
Women state legislators in Missouri
Year of birth missing (living people)